Absolute Deception (also known as Deception) is a 2013 Australian/Canadian international co-production action-thriller film directed by Brian Trenchard-Smith and starring Cuba Gooding Jr. and Emmanuelle Vaugier. The film was released on direct-to-DVD in the United States on June 11, 2013.

Premise
When a widowed reporter is informed by an FBI agent that her deceased husband has just been murdered, the two join forces to uncover a web of deceit that is shocking and more deadly than anyone could imagine.

Cast

Production
The film was shot in Gold Coast, Queensland, Australia in 15 days with actors plus two days of shooting a car chase. Brian Trenchard-Smith has a cameo in the film as a Police Commissioner.

Home media
DVD was released in Region 1 in the United States on June 11, 2013, it was distributed by Sony Pictures Home Entertainment.

References

External links
 

2013 films
2013 direct-to-video films
2013 action thriller films
Australian action thriller films
Canadian action thriller films
English-language Canadian films
Films set in Queensland
Films shot in Australia
Voltage Pictures films
Sony Pictures direct-to-video films
Australian action adventure films
2010s English-language films
Films directed by Brian Trenchard-Smith
2010s Canadian films